Locked Up may refer to:
 Imprisonment
 "Locked Up" (song), by hip hop/R&B artist Akon
 Locked Up: A Mother's Rage, a 1991 TV movie
 Locked Up (TV series), a Spanish television series, originally titled Vis a vis
 "Locked Up!", an episode of the television series Victorious
 "Locked Up", a song by Lil Durk from the album Love Songs 4 the Streets 2

See also 
 Lock up (disambiguation)
 Locked Up Abroad, a British docudrama television series, originally titled Banged Up Abroad